Panchrysia dives is a moth of the family Noctuidae. It is found from the Ural, east through southern Siberia to the Pacific Ocean. The range includes Kamchatka, Sakhalin and the Kuriles.

The wingspan is 29–37 mm. The ground colour of the forewings is chestnut brown. The distal area contains several large metallic silvery-white spots. The hindwings are yellow to orange.
There is one generation per year with adults on wing from June to August.

References

Further reading
 Barry Goater, László Ronkay und Michael Fibiger: Catocalinae & Plusiinae Noctuidae Europaeae, Volume 10., Sorø 2003

External links

 nic.funet.fi Taxonomy
Lepiforum.de

Moths described in 1844
Moths of Europe
Plusiini